Ambrogio Bessi (born 1 July 1915, date of death unknown) was an Italian basketball player. He competed in the 1936 Summer Olympics.

References

1915 births
Year of death missing
Italian men's basketball players
Olympic basketball players of Italy
Basketball players at the 1936 Summer Olympics
Sportspeople from Trieste